Paul Bouveret (26 September 1920 – 18 April 2003) was a French cross-country skier who competed in the 1948 Winter Olympics.

References

1920 births
2003 deaths
French male cross-country skiers
Olympic cross-country skiers of France
Cross-country skiers at the 1948 Winter Olympics